The McCormick Freedom Museum was the first museum in the United States dedicated to the First Amendment by the McCormick Foundation.  It was open from April 11, 2006, until March 1, 2009.  The museum offered visitors an interactive experience focused on first amendment rights which include freedom of speech, freedom of religion, freedom of the press, assembly and petition. It was located on Michigan Avenue along the Magnificent Mile next to the historic Tribune Tower.

A sculpture by artists Amy Larimer and Peter Bernheim, titled 12151791 was put into storage when the museum closed. Its title represents the date of  December 15, 1791, when the United States Bill of Rights was ratified.

One journalist has noted the irony of a Freedom Museum being named after the Robert R. McCormick, owner of the Chicago Tribune newspaper, saying the name "puts ego before freedom".
A scaled-down  mobile version of the museum, dubbed the Freedom Express, made its debut in Chicago's Pioneer Court on May 27, 2010.

References

External links
 

Virtual museums
Defunct museums in Illinois
Museums established in 2006
Museums disestablished in 2009